William Ogle Moore (1 July 1801, Dublin –  14 May 1874, Chelsea) was an Irish Anglican priest: he was Dean of Cashel from 1857 to 1861; and Dean of Clogher from 1862 to 1873.

Moore was educated at Trinity College, Dublin. Before his years at the deanery he was Curate then Vicar  of Blessington. He married Anna Alice Casey, daughter of Thomas Casey MP; she died aged 78 at Taunton on 13 September 1882: their daughter Jane Ogle Moore (1841 – 1934) was the wife of Richard Henn Collins, an Anglo-Irish lawyer and judge.

References

Irish Anglicans
Alumni of Trinity College Dublin
Deans of Cashel
Deans of Clogher